Greece participated with 48 athletes at the 1998 European Athletics Championships held in Budapest, Hungary.

Medals

Results

References 

1998
Nations at the 1998 European Athletics Championships
1998 in Greek sport